The Mystery of the Yellow Room is a 1919 American crime drama film made by the Mayflower Photoplay Company and distributed through Realart Pictures Corporation. Émile Chautard served as a producer.

The Mystery of the Yellow Room (in French Le mystère de la chambre jaune) was originally a novel by Gaston Leroux, one of the first locked room mystery novels. It was first published in France in the periodical L'Illustration from September 1907 to November 1907, then in its own right as a book in 1908.

The film, which itself is a remake of Chautard's "Le Mystère de la chambre jaune" (1913), was remade in 1930, 1949 and in 2003.

Plot
Mathilde Strangerson (Terry), whose father is a renowned French scientist, is heard to utter a piercing scream while supposedly alone in her room. Her father and other rush to the scene and find a room so securely locked and barred that no one could have entered or made their escape. She receives medical care while detectives are called in to investigate the case. Each has their pet theory about the crime, all of which seem to be based on logic. Gradually the light of suspicion filters through the members of the household and those associated with it. Mathilde's fiancee is placed in prison to await trial as most of the evidence points to him as the criminal. Then, Joseph Rouletabille (Raker) is called in to decipher the mystery. Rouletabille finds that the detective who was most persistent in his investigation is responsible. Mathilde's fiancee is then released and a happy ending occurs.

Cast
William Walcott as Professor Strangerson 
Edmund Elton as Robert Darzac
George Cowl as Frederic Larsan
Ethel Grey Terry as Mathilde Strangerson
Lorin Raker as Rouletabille / Joe-Jo
Jean Del Val as Jean Sainclair 
W.H. Burton as Daddy Jacques
Henry S. Koser as Bernier
Jean Ewing as Mme. Bernier
William Morrison as Judge de Marquet
Louis R. Grisel as Monsieur Maleine 
John McQuire as Mathieu
Catherine Ashley as Mme. Mathieu
Ivan Dobble as The Green Man

See also
 Whodunit

References

External list

1919 films
American silent feature films
Films based on French novels
Films based on works by Gaston Leroux
American black-and-white films
American remakes of French films
1919 crime drama films
American crime drama films
1910s American films
Silent American drama films